Thomas Welsby Clark was a sailor in the Royal Australian Navy (RAN), whose body was found on a life raft in the Indian Ocean, off Christmas Island, on 6 February 1942. 

Before his body was identified, he was widely believed to originate from the RAN cruiser , which sank off Western Australia in November 1941 after a battle with the German auxiliary cruiser . While 318 of 399  personnel survived, the crew of Sydney was lost with all 645 hands. He was identified on 19 November 2021 as Able Seaman Thomas Welsby Clark.

Background
Clark was born on 28 January 1920, in Brisbane. He enlisted in the Royal Australian Navy on 23 August 1940, and was trained as a submarine detector at HMAS Cerberus and HMAS St Giles. Clark joined Sydneys crew on 19 August 1941, and was promoted to Able Seaman several days later. He was newly engaged at the time of Sydney'''s sinking.

His body was found on 6 February 1942. It is reported that an inquest was held on Christmas Island, soon afterwards. His remains were buried with military honours, in an unmarked grave, in the Old European Cemetery on the island. At the Battle of Christmas Island, Japanese forces captured the island on 31 March 1942 and it remained in their hands until 1945. Records, including any relating to the inquest, appear to have been lost or destroyed during the occupation.

Witnesses on Christmas Island believed that the float and sailor had come from Sydney. A post-war investigation by the RAN, including attempts to reconstruct the lost records by those who wrote them, determined that the body could possibly be a member of the service. Christmas Island's assistant harbour master at the time, Captain E. Craig, stated that "the Carley float was typical of those in service with the RN and RAN". A government inquiry concluded "on the balance of probability, that the body and the carley float ... were most likely from HMAS Sydney."

An archaeological team commissioned by the RAN recovered the body in 2006. A DNA profile and other data about the individual's background were recovered, before from the remains were reburied, at Geraldton, in the Australian war cemetery closest to the wreck of Sydney. Due to items found with the body, including clothing, it was considered most likely that he had been an engineering officer or NCO. By 2014, a process of elimination had established that no more than 50 members of the crew could have been the man on the Carley float.  

In 2019, it was reported – but not confirmed officially – by news media that Norman Douglas Foster was the Sydney crew member most likely to have been buried on Christmas Island. Foster, who was 28 years old at the time of his ship's last action, was an Engine Room Artificer, 4th Class (a rank equivalent to Petty Officer).

Discovery of the body
During the late afternoon of 6 February 1942, lookouts on Christmas Island spotted an object out at sea. Initially thought to be a Japanese submarine, closer inspection from a pilot boat found it was a Carley float with a dead person inside and the float was towed ashore. With the island at risk of invasion, the deceased was quickly examined by the harbour master, the medical officer and the man in charge of the radio station, then the body was buried in an unmarked grave near Flying Fish Cove.Cole, The Loss of HMAS Sydney II, vol. 2, pp. 324–6 The examiners wrote reports but these were destroyed when Japanese forces occupied Christmas Island and later recreated from memory.Frame, HMAS Sydney, p. 203 An inquest was not convened until mid-February and had not concluded when evacuation began on 17 February, Japanese forces occupying the island on 23 March. It is unknown if the doctor on Christmas Island had performed an autopsy; if so it was never found.

Initial investigations and research
A preliminary examination in 1942 by the island's medical officer, Dr J. Scott Clark, found that the deceased was reported to have been a young adult male caucasoid who was tall by the standards of his time. The remains were partly decomposed, the eyes, nose and all of the flesh from the right arm were missing and believed to have been consumed by fish or birds. According to the Harbour Master, Captain J. R. Smith, the body was clothed in a blue boilersuit which had been bleached white by exposure, with four plain press studs from neck to waist. However, J.C. Baker, who was in charge of the radio station at Christmas Island, stated that the boilersuit was white. The body was not carrying dog tags or personal effects.

A shoe was found beside the body, which Clark did not believe belonged to the dead man. Later recollections of the shoe varied, Clark stated that it was "probably branded "CROWN BRAND PTY 4", although he had some doubts about "CROWN" and "4". Captain Smith, recalled a canvas shoe of a brand named "McCOWAN PTY" or "McEWAN PTY", which carried symbols representing a crown and/or a broad arrow. A sergeant with the party who recovered the raft later contradicted the finding of a shoe stating that a 'pair of boots' were found on the raft.

In Smith's opinion, the life raft was a naval Carley float, which had come from Sydney. The wooden decking was manufactured and branded with the word "PATENT" while the metal framework was branded "LYSAGHT DUA-ANNEAL ZINC. MADE IN AUSTRALIA" inside.  The float had been damaged by gun or shellfire, with shrapnel embedded in the outer covering, and the underside was covered with barnacles and other marine growth, indicating that it had been at sea for some time.

On 23 April 1949, the Director of Naval Intelligence wrote to the Director of Victualling (DNV) with regard to whether the uniform worn by the dead man and the Carley float were consistent with the crew and equipment of Sydney. With regard to the uniform, the DNV stated, in a hand-written note that, while boilersuits with press studs had not been issued by the RAN at the time, officers could purchase their own boilersuits, usually white or brown, with press studs. (Navy issue boilersuits worn by ratings were blue, but did not have press studs.) The shoes could "definitely" have been of RAN issue, especially if they were leather (not canvas). There is no record of a reply regarding the Carley float.

 Controversy regarding raft 
The RAN claimed that the covering of the carley float did not match those used by Australian warships and thus could not have come from Sydney.   The historian Tom Frame was also sceptical about the raft and that its connections to the Sydney were circumstantial. For many years, other authors, like the historian Barbara Winter (1984) and independent researcher Wes Olson (2000) disputed the official view put forward by the RAN. According to Olson, it was unclear how the RAN decided that the float cover was anomalous, as contemporary accounts of the float were often vague and/or contradictory. Olson said that the only detail of the covering in witness descriptions appeared to be that it was grey. Winter suggested that the currents of the Indian Ocean would have propelled a carley float, launched at the location and time of the battle, to the vicinity of Christmas Island, at around the time of its discovery. According to Olson, the rope used on the float and markings on the float were of naval origin and the descriptions of marine growth on the float matched the period that a float from Sydney would have been in the water. In 2000, Olson claimed that evidence presented at the 1998 inquiry had changed Frame's mind.

 Investigations since 1998 
Recovery of the body
The 1998 Joint Standing Committee for Foreign Affairs, Defence and Trade inquiry into the loss of Sydney recommended that attempts be made to find the grave, to exhume the body and acquire DNA for comparison with the next of kin of the crew of Sydney, to determine if the unknown sailor was from the cruiser. The RAN searched the graveyard during August and September 2001 to no avail but a second search in October 2006 found the body.Cole, The Loss of HMAS Sydney II, vol. 2, pp. 332 When it was found, the body was in an unusually-shaped coffin, which appeared to have been constructed around it as the body was buried "with legs doubled under at the knee" the same position it had been in when found on the raft, possibly due to mummification. Press studs and small fragments of clothing were found in the coffin. Following an autopsy and the taking of samples from the body for identification, the remains of the unknown sailor were reburied in the Commonwealth War Graves section in the Geraldton Cemetery in Western Australia with full military honours on 19 November 2008.Cole, The Loss of HMAS Sydney II, vol. 2, pp. 323

Autopsy and subsequent research
Brain trauma caused by a shell fragment of German origin has been identified as the cause of death.Billson 2007 Bruce Billson (the Minister Assisting the Minister for Defence) reported that a piece of shrapnel struck the front of the skull and lodged in the left forehead. On first examination, it was thought that the fragment might have been a bullet, although this hypothesis was later rejected. In addition to this injury, the pathologist identified a second major skull injury, with bone loss on the left side, above and behind the left earhole, which is also believed to have occurred around the time of death. The analysis also identified multiple rib fractures, but it is unknown whether these occurred around the time of death or long after death with the settling of the grave. No other shrapnel or projectiles have been found elsewhere in the remains.

The fragment  was found embedded in the man's skull during an autopsy in 2006. Bone isotope analysis showed that he had lived in eastern Australia, probably New South Wales or Queensland, before enlistment and may have grown up on the coast. The unknown sailor had acquired an unusual feature in both ankle joints, known as squatting facets; these indicated that he was more used to squatting than sitting on chairs. As squatting was unusual at the time in urban, western communities, it was speculated that the man had spent significant time
 in a rural area of Australia;
 amongst members of an ethnic group in which squatting was more common than sitting (such as people from Asia or Eastern Europe) and/or
 involved in a sporting or similar activity that required the ankles to be flexed towards the back of the thighs for prolonged periods.

Attempts to extract a DNA profile from the remains began around 2009, although the results were not published before the Cole Inquiry. Analysis of the partial genetic profile recovered has since suggested that the man had red hair, blue eyes and pale skin, and was likely of Irish or Scottish descent. He belonged to a mitochondrial haplogroup (i.e. an ancient matrilineal line of descent) known as haplogroup J1c12. This relatively rare haplogroup has most often been found in people with matrilineal ancestors from various parts of Europe, the Caucasus or Middle East.

The boilersuit and shoe found with the body were, according to evidence provided by the Australian War Memorial, available to ship's officers, commissioned warrant officers and warrant officers senior enough to have a watch keeping certificate. Tests on the remains of the boilersuit showed that the fabric had never been dyed, was probably white and the press studs were of a type manufactured by Carr Australia Pty Ltd in the 1930s and 1940s. RAN Dress Regulations published in the Navy List of December 1940 do not mention white boilersuits. There is evidence that during the period, boilersuits were a popular working dress among RAN personnel. Many RAN engineer officers wore white boilersuits most of the time and other officers, commissioned warrant officers and warrant officers also wore them. Two former RAN officers recalled being issued with a white boilersuit twice a year, that these were fastened with four or five press studs and that some had press studs at the wrist, while others did not. Dress regulations for December 1940 state that RAN personnel on "foreign" (tropical) stations were issued with a pair of white canvas shoes to be worn only on those stations. While veterans did not recall being issued with them or seeing them worn, photographs of RAN personnel from the period show some of them wearing white canvas shoes. 

By 2014, the identity of the unknown sailor had been narrowed, to 50 members of the crew of Sydney. It had previous been reported (2007) that the unknown sailor was most likely one of three engineering officers.

 Erroneous identification 
In August 2019, it was reported – but not confirmed officially – by media outlets including Channel 7 News and The West Australian, that the Sydney crew member most likely to have been buried on Christmas Island was Norman Douglas Foster. Foster (service no. F2147), was an Engine Room Artificer (4th Class) – a rank equivalent to Petty Officer; he was born in Perth on 15 April 1913, making him 28 years old at the time of the action in which Sydney was lost.

Foster's service record describes him as 5 ft 8 in. (174 cm) tall, with auburn hair, blue eyes and a fair complexion. He had joined the RAN on 2 September 1939 (the day before the war began); following training at HMAS Cerberus, Foster had joined the crew of Sydney on 20 February 1941.

Formal identification
In 2021, DNA testing identified the remains as those of 21-year-old Able Seaman Thomas Welsby Clark. The identity was revealed at the Australian War Memorial on 19 November 2021, the 80th anniversary of the battle.

After the announcement of the body's identity, Minister for Veterans' Affairs Andrew Gee noted that Clark is believed to be the only member of Sydney''s crew who managed to reach a life raft after the cruiser sank.

See also
List of solved missing person cases
List of people who disappeared mysteriously at sea

Citations

References
 Bruce Billson (Minister Assisting the Minister for Defence) "Further Results in Relation to Christmas Island Remains" (Press Release, 12 February 2007)
 Katharina Chase, "Unravelling a World War II mystery" (Defence Magazine, November/December 2006)
 
 
 
 
 
 

1940s missing person cases
1941 deaths
1942 in Australia
20th century in Christmas Island
Australian military personnel killed in World War II
Deaths in Australia
Formerly missing people
History of Christmas Island
Military history of Australia during World War II
Missing person cases in Australia
People who died at sea
Royal Australian Navy personnel of World War II
Unidentified decedents